Death Bringer, alternatively titled Galdregon's Domain in Europe, is a 1988 role-playing video game originally developed and self-published by Pandora and released for the Amiga, Atari ST, Commodore 64, TurboGrafx-CD, and Sharp X68000.

Plot

The game is set in the fictional world of Mezron, where a wizard by the name of Azazeal has been resurrected and is searching for the five gems of Zator. The player takes control of a warrior charged with recovering the jewels by battling many minions who guard them, such as Medusa and High Priestess Set. They then venture into the catacombs of Castle Secnar and battle the undead.

References

External links
 Death Bringer at Hall of Light Amiga database
 

1988 video games
Amiga games
Atari ST games
Commodore 64 games
X68000 games
Telenet Japan games
TurboGrafx-CD games
Tactical role-playing video games
Video games developed in the United Kingdom